Kew Gardens is a Grade II–listed London Underground and London Overground station in Kew, in the London Borough of Richmond upon Thames. It first opened in 1869 and is now managed by London Underground.

Kew Gardens Station Footbridge, also a Grade II-listed structure, is next to the station, on the southern side.

Access

There is also an entrance, which is wheelchair-accessible, on North Road, on the other side of the railway line; the two entrances are connected by a pedestrian subway.

History
The station was opened by the London and South Western Railway (L&SWR) on 1 January 1869, in an area of market gardens and orchards. The station was located on a new L&SWR branch line to Richmond built from the West London Joint Railway starting north of Addison Road station (now ). The line ran through Shepherd's Bush and Hammersmith via a now closed curve and Grove Road station (also now closed) in Hammersmith. Via a short connection from the North & South Western Junction Railway (N&SWJR) to Gunnersbury the line was also served by the North London Railway (NLR).

On 1 June 1877, the District Railway (DR, now the District line) opened a short extension from its terminus at Hammersmith to connect to the L&SWR tracks east of  station. The DR then began running trains over the L&SWR tracks to Richmond. On 1 October 1877, the Metropolitan Railway (MR, now the Metropolitan line) restarted the GWR's former service to Richmond via Grove Road station.

The DR's service between Richmond, Hammersmith and central London was more direct than the NLR's route via , the L&SWR's or the MR's routes via Grove Road station or the L&SWR's other route from Richmond via . From 1 January 1894, the GWR began sharing the MR's Richmond service and served Kew Gardens once again, meaning that passengers from Kew Gardens could travel on the services of five operators.

This was completed on 1 August 1905 and DR services on the line were then operated with electric trains. However, the L&SWR, NLR, GWR and MR services continued to be steam-hauled.

MR services were withdrawn on 31 December 1906 and GWR services were withdrawn on 31 December 1910, leaving operations at Kew Gardens and Gunnersbury to the DR (by then known as the District Railway), the NLR and L&SWR. By 1916, the L&SWR's route through Hammersmith was being out-competed by the District to such a degree that the L&SWR withdrew its service between Richmond and Addison Road on 3 June 1916, leaving the District as the sole operator over that route.

A brass plaque at the station commemorates its reopening on 7 October 1989 by Michael Portillo MP, Minister of State for Transport, after it had been refurbished.

Present
The two-storey yellow brick station buildings are unusually fine examples of mid-Victorian railway architecture and are protected as part of the Kew Gardens conservation area. The station is one of the few remaining 19th-century stations on the North London Line and had one of the last illuminated banner signals on the London Underground, possibly because of the footbridge. This signal was replaced by an electronic version in 2011.

Kew Gardens is the only station on the London Underground network that has a pub attached to it. The pub has a door (no longer in use) which leads out onto platform 1. Previously known as The Railway, the pub reopened after renovation in 2013 as The Tap on the Line.

Kew Gardens Station Footbridge

The footbridge to the south of the station is also noteworthy and is Grade II-listed in its own right. The railway line bisected Kew, but it was not until 1912 that the bridge was provided to allow residents to cross the tracks safely (previously, a level crossing was used, with the added disadvantage of delaying trains). It is a rare surviving example of a reinforced concrete structure built using a pioneering technique devised by the French engineer François Hennebique. The bridge has a narrow deck and very high walls, originally designed to protect its users' clothing from the smoke of steam trains passing underneath. It also has protrusions on either side of the deck to deflect smoke away from the bridge structure. It was restored in 2004 with a grant from the Heritage Lottery Fund, in a project led by The Kew Society. In July 2017, concerns were expressed about the structural safety of the bridge.

Services

Kew Gardens currently has the following London Underground and National Rail London Overground services, which are operated by the London Underground S7 stock and British Rail Class 378:

London Underground
6 trains per hour (tph) to Upminster
6 tph to Richmond

London Overground
 4 tph to Stratford
 4 tph to Richmond
 4 tph each way on Sundays

Connections
There are no lifts. Platform 2 (going towards central London) is at ground level. Platform 1 (going towards Richmond) is reached by a short set of 10 steps; there is also a wheelchair-accessible ramp. The National Archives is on the Platform 1 side of the station. The shops of Kew village, Sandycombe Road, and the Royal Botanic Gardens, Kew are on the Platform 2 side, and visitors to those locations who alight at Platform 1 must cross the tracks via either the tunnel underneath (left of the main exit, 15 steps down, then 22 steps up) or the footbridge (right of the main exit, 30 steps up, then 30 steps down). The simplest alternative for those wishing to avoid the steps is to remain on the train while it travels one stop to Richmond and returns.

London Buses route 110 serves the station.

In popular culture
Kew Gardens station appeared in the BBC comedy drama Love Soup (Series 2, Episode 1 – Smoke and Shadows, 1 March 2008) as the fictional "Hove West" station.

See also
Kew Bridge railway station
North Sheen railway station

Notes and references

External links

 Transport for London: Kew Gardens Underground station
London Transport Museum Photographic Archive 

 from National Rail

Railway stations in the London Borough of Richmond upon Thames
Tube stations in the London Borough of Richmond upon Thames
Former London and South Western Railway stations
Railway stations in Great Britain opened in 1869
Railway stations served by London Overground
District line stations
1869 establishments in England
Grade II listed buildings in the London Borough of Richmond upon Thames
Grade II listed railway stations
Kew, London
Royal Botanic Gardens, Kew